Andrey Vadimovich Kemarsky (born 1 January 1955) is a career diplomat. Since 28 October 2020 he has been serving as Ambassador of Russia to Botswana.  He has previously served as the Ambassador Extraordinary and Plenipotentiary of the Russian Federation to the Republic of Angola, with concurrent accreditation to the Democratic Republic of São Tomé and Príncipe, and the Ambassador Extraordinary and Plenipotentiary to Mozambique, with concurrent accreditation to Swaziland.

Kemarsky graduated from the Moscow State Institute of International Relations in 1979, and worked in various diplomatic posts in the central offices of the Ministry of Foreign Affairs and abroad.

In November 2002, Kemarsky was appointed as Ambassador of Russia to Angola, and was accredited to São Tomé and Príncipe in 2003.

Kemarsky speaks Russian, English and Portuguese.

References 

1955 births
Living people
Moscow State Institute of International Relations alumni
Soviet diplomats
Ambassador Extraordinary and Plenipotentiary (Russian Federation)
Ambassadors of Russia to Angola
Ambassadors of Russia to São Tomé and Príncipe
Ambassadors of Russia to Mozambique
Ambassadors of Russia to Eswatini
Ambassadors of Russia to Botswana